Kenrō, Kenro or Kenrou (written:  or ) is a masculine Japanese given name. Notable people with the name include:

, Japanese rower
, Japanese photographer
, Japanese freestyle skier

Japanese masculine given names